(3-Aminopropyl)triethoxysilane (APTES) is an aminosilane frequently used in the process of silanization, the functionalization of surfaces with alkoxysilane molecules. It can also be used for covalent attaching of organic films to metal oxides such as silica and titania.

Use with PDMS
APTES can be used to covalently bond thermoplastics to poly(dimethylsiloxane) (PDMS). Thermoplastics are treated with oxygen plasma to functionalize surface molecules, and subsequently coated with an aqueous 1% by volume APTES solution. PDMS is treated with oxygen plasma and placed in contact with the functionalized thermoplastic surface. A stable, covalent bond forms within 2 minutes.

Silsesquioxane synthesis 
Octa(3-aminopropyl)silsesquioxane can be obtained in a one step hydrolytic condensation using APTES and hydrochloric or trifluoromethanesulfonic acid (CFSOH).

Use with cell cultures 
APTES-functionalized surfaces have been shown to be nontoxic to embryonic rat cardiomyocytes in vitro. Further experimentation is needed to evaluate toxicity to other cell types in extended culture.

Toxicity
APTES is a toxic compound with an MSDS health hazard score of 3. APTES fumes are destructive to the mucous membranes and the upper respiratory tract, and should be used in a fume hood with gloves. If a fume hood is not available, a face shield and full face respirator must be implemented. The target organs of APTES are nerves, liver and kidney.

References

Amines
Silyl ethers